Linda is a Hungarian action adventure series that aired on Hungarian television from 1984–1989, and was created by György Gát.

The first season was broadcast by Magyar Televízió from 1984, the second from 1986, and the third from 1989. Between 1984 and 1987, 10 parts were made, and between 1987 and 1991, 7 parts. At that time, two manufacturers were already involved, as in the beginning even Mafilm, and later the Tele P-Art Production Office, joined. a series was also made. The 5 episodes of the second series were shot between 1999 and 2000. Genre of criminal film comedy series. The TV film series was produced by Hungarian Television and Tele P-Art, and was released on DVD by Budapest Film.

Its director is György Gát, and in the third season they organized the episodes together with Miklós Szurdi. The main roles are played by Nóra Görbe, Béla Szerednyey, Gyula Bodrogi and Ildikó Pécsi. More and more generations are growing up on the series, and his popularity remains unbroken. The newer parts presented in 2002, unlike the older episodes, form a sequel. However, this series was not as huge a success as Linda in the 1980s.

In 1986, the screenwriters of the series - András Coper, György Gát and Ádám Rozgonyi - published a novel entitled Linda Safari. This story has not been filmed, it only exists in the form of a book. Its main characters are characters from the film. Linda is sent to Vienna this time for further training, but before she leaves, she finds a corpse and then gets involved in an international crime throughout the story.

Linda also appeared as a comic book series in the pioneering magazine Buddy. In the story, one of the professors of the KFKI Central Physical Research Institute commits crimes, but when Linda sets out to capture her, the scientist pushes him into a time machine on the territory of the institute, and XIV. He sends him back to the time of Louis, where Linda meets Dumas' three mustkeers, Athos, Porthos and Aramis. The story was interrupted here as the story could not be continued and was not a success among readers.

The broadcasting rights to the film were also purchased by two commercial channels: it ran at RTL Klub in 1999, was repeated by m1 in 2003, was broadcast by Viasat 3 from 2005, and was shown again on m1 from the end of August 2008. It was screened on m2 in summer 2010 and on m1 in 2011.

Between 2012 and 2015, the 17 + 5 part was broadcast by Duna Television and Duna World, and from the summer of 2015 by m3.

The first two seasons were also released in DVD format, with 2 episodes per disc.

In January 2013, Origo.hu reported that director Martin Csaba planned to make a film titled Linda Returns, but this did not materialize.

Plot
Linda Veszprém, a graduate high school girl, decides to become a police officer. However, her family does not consider this profession a good choice: her father and teachers would prefer to see her as a biologist or researcher, and his classmates regularly mock her for her mania, but she does not complain about them either. Tamás Emődi, one of his classmates, likes Linda and courts her. She doesn't seem to notice it, but once her father remarks to Tamás, "she's constantly reading your stupid love poems."

Linda's first successful affair begins at school, disposing of the “satir” smelling after her classmate, and then using a brilliant investigation to find out who her classmate is her real father.

Later she served in the traffic police, then she fought on the ranks and served as a lieutenant alongside Gábor Eősze. Her boss, on the other hand, is not happy about the overly enthusiastic girl, who seems to want to get into trouble. Rain will do everything he can to keep Linda away from more serious crimes, so entrust her with simple tasks. Eosse is very strict, but this is much more motivated by a sense of concern because she doesn't want the girl to get in any trouble. However, Linda, whether willingly or unintentionally, encounters serious crimes, in which case she is also confronted with aberrant individuals, so her boss's concerns are also justified. They are regularly sent to further training to have peace of mind, so without success, because Linda is constantly involved in spectacular fights. The detective stumbles upon a variety of crimes: robbery, mafia case, serial murder, but the foody, combative and clever girl all detects these. In addition to the mysterious crimes, the mood is enhanced by Linda's impressive taekwondo knowledge, and even the laughing and captivating portrayal of her father Béla Veszprémi and her large-scale girlfriend Klára, as well as Linda's taxi groom, Tamás, who is often unfortunate to grow up.

Cast
Nóra Görbe as Linda Veszprémi
Béla Szerednyey as Tamás Emődi
Gyula Bodrogi as Béla Veszprémi
Ildikó Pécsi as Klára Steinbach
Gábor Deme as Gábor Eősze (pilot episodes)
Vayer Tamás (voice dubbed by Miklós Tolnai) as Gábor Eősze (1986-1990)
Gábor Harsányi as Gyula Handel
Péter Balázs as Bosó/Zoltán Kő
Mária Ronyecz as Bagoly
György Bánffy as Doki
Katalin Lukácsy as Ibike (police secretary)
Béla Romwalter (voice dubbed by Péter Beregi) as Ricsi
Ottó Elek (voice dubbed by András Várkonyi) as Ottó

Episode list

Pilots

Season 1

Season 2

Revival
The makers filmed the sequel to Linda in 2000. Nóra Görbe was already inundated with letters from fans asking for a sequel. However, the actress resisted the request for a long time, as she admitted that she was too boxed into the role of the screaming policewoman and did not receive any role offers from the directors. She finally accepted that this was how the audience locked her in their heart. In 1999, she was approached by Magyar Televízió and told that a part of the former staff had formed. Eventually, she was persuaded to have a sequel, which was broadcast for the first time on March 19, 2002, after many strokes. In addition to Nóra Görbe, Béla Szerednyey and Gyula Bodrogi, actors such as Péter Blaskó, Tibor Gazdag, László Borbély, Károly Gesztesi, Róbert Gergely, Péter Gábor Vincze, Kriszta Bíró, etc. took part in the new series.

Season 1

Lawsuit
In 2019, Zoltan Krisko started  a  lawsuit against Marvel Comics as he claimed that the opening song of the 1990s X-Men animated television series is too similar to Linda's theme song.

References

External links

1984 Hungarian television series debuts
1989 Hungarian television series endings
Martial arts television series
Action television series
1980s crime drama television series
1980s comedy-drama television series
Hungarian-language television shows